Saint Joseph Academy (SJA) is a Parochial, Catholic Co-Educational School from grade 7 to 12 located in the heart of Cuyo, a town in Palawan.

Schools in Palawan